Kick Your Ass in 17 Minutes. is the debut studio album by Los Angeles rock band The Drills, fronted by Canadian guitarist, singer and songwriter Phil X. It is the only album to feature the first Drills line-up. The last track is a medley of vocals taken from the rest of the album.

Track listing
 "Air Hockey Champion of the World"
 "Beautiful Apartment" 
 "Sunny Days" 
 "Middle Finger"
 "I Wish My Beer Was As Cold As Your Heart"
 "From the Future" 
 "Medley: Aneurism"

Personnel
Phil X – guitars, vocals
Daniel Spree – bass, backing vocals
Brian "Dogboy" Burwell – drums

References

2009 albums